Withlacoochee River Park is located in Pasco County, in the U.S. state of Florida. It includes a canoe launch, dock,  of hiking trails, as well a bicycling, bird watching, picnic facilities, camping, fishing, an observation tower, and a 30-acre rec field. Habitats in the area include high sandhills and low riverine swamp.

Withlacoochee River Park is located northeast of the intersection of County Road 35 Alternate (Old Lakeland Highway) and County Road 52 Alternate (Clinton Avenue).

See also

References

External links
 Florida Nature Coast - Pasco County - Withlacoochee River Park Visitor's information (includes short video tour)

Parks in Pasco County, Florida
Southwest Florida Water Management District reserves